The Women's 58 kg weightlifting event was an event at the 2014 Commonwealth Games, limiting competitors to a maximum of  of body mass. The competition took place on 26 July and was the fifth weightlifting event to conclude. The event took place at the Clyde Auditorium.

Result

References

Weightlifting at the 2014 Commonwealth Games
Common